Fabrizio Landriani (died 1642) was a Roman Catholic prelate who served as Bishop of Pavia (1617–1642).

Biography
Fabrizio Landriani was born in Milan, Italy.
On 17 Jul 1617, he was appointed during the papacy of Pope Paul V as Bishop of Pavia.
On 10 Sep 1617, he was consecrated bishop by Giambattista Leni, Bishop of Ferrara, with Francesco Sacrati, Titular Archbishop of Damascus, and Evangelista Tornioli, Bishop of Città di Castello, serving as co-consecrators. 
He served as Bishop of Pavia until his death in 1642.

Episcopal succession
While bishop, he was the principal co-consecrator of:

References

External links and additional sources
 (for Chronology of Bishops) 
 (for Chronology of Bishops) 

17th-century Italian Roman Catholic bishops
Bishops appointed by Pope Paul V
1642 deaths